Richard Ian "Rico" Tice (born 3 June 1966) is an Anglican clergyman and writer, co-author of Christianity Explored. He is currently associate minister at All Souls Church, Langham Place, London, and is well known in the UK as a speaker at evangelical Christian conferences and an evangelist of national standing.

Early life
Born in Chile in 1966, the son of a businessman and a nurse, Tice grew up in Uganda and Zaire. He was educated at Sherborne School, Dorset and spent a gap year working as a youth worker in inner-city Liverpool. He then studied History at Bristol University, where he also captained the rugby team.

His progress towards full-time Christian ministry began with a period as a lay assistant at Christ Church Clifton in Bristol. After working briefly for Hewlett Packard, he trained for ordination at Wycliffe Hall, Oxford.

Christian ministry
He was ordained in the Church of England in 1994, and shortly afterwards joined the staff team at the internationally known All Souls, Langham Place in 1994 as associate minister. His main role is to help the hundreds of enquirers about the Christian faith who come through the doors of the church each year. In an interview in 2000 he confirmed his desire to focus on evangelism.

He co-wrote Christianity Explored with Barry Cooper; this is a widely used range of resources for people enquiring about the Christian faith. He also presents the associated videos.

In 2003, 2009 and 2013, Tice led the OICCU mission at Oxford University. He is a non-executive director of Christians in Sport.

Tice has written a number of books in collaboration with co-authors, many of them published by The Good Book Company. His book Faithful Leaders and the things that matter most was published in 2021  is a response to a series of scandals about leadership failure in the evangelical church.

Personal life
Tice was married at All Souls, Langham Place, London on 20 December 2008.

He lists his hobbies as rugby, golf and films.

Bibliography 
In addition to his work on Christianity Explored Tice has published a number of books on evangelism, and other books aimed at explaining the Christian faith for those investigating it. Books include:

 Honest Evangelism: how to talk about Jesus even when it's tough, co-written with Carl Laferton
 A Very Different Christmas, co-written with Nate-Morgan Locke
 Capturing God, a book that explores the Easter message
 Faithful Leaders and the things that matter most, The Good Book Company (2021)

References

External links
  Photo of Rico Tice
 

1966 births
Living people
Alumni of the University of Bristol
Alumni of Wycliffe Hall, Oxford
21st-century English Anglican priests
Anglican writers
Evangelical Anglican clergy
People educated at Sherborne School